Ikobo is a groupment within Wanyanga sector within Walikale Territory in North Kivu province of the Democratic Republic of the Congo. It is located about a day's walk from the Uganda-DRC border.

History
The village was abandoned in 2000, following a series of raids by Pareco militiamen.

References

Populated places in North Kivu